Wayne Township is one of thirteen townships in Henry County, Indiana, United States. As of the 2010 census, its population was 4,216 and it contained 1,828 housing units.

Geography
The streams of Buck Creek, Central Creek, Duck Creek, Glen Run, Grant Run, Knox Run, Perry Brook and Ring Run run through this township.

Cities and towns
 Knightstown

Unincorporated towns
 Grant City
 Knox
 Maple Valley
 Raysville
(This list is based on USGS data and may include former settlements.)

Adjacent townships
 Greensboro Township (northeast)
 Spiceland Township (east)
 Center Township, Rush County (southeast)
 Ripley Township, Rush County (south)
 Jackson Township, Hancock County (west)
 Brown Township, Hancock County (northwest)

Cemeteries
The township contains one cemetery, Glencove.

Major highways
  Interstate 70
  U.S. Route 40
  State Road 109
  State Road 140

Airports and landing strips
 Willcox Airport

References
 U.S. Board on Geographic Names (GNIS)
 United States Census Bureau cartographic boundary files

External links
 Indiana Township Association
 United Township Association of Indiana

Townships in Henry County, Indiana
Townships in Indiana